Claude Plessier is a French painter, born in Paris in 1946 who has worked in France and Argentina.

A graduate of the Arts Décos, the Beaux-Arts and the Allgemeine Gewerbe Schule in Basel he was awarded a scholarship by the Italian government to study mosaic in Ravenna in 1971. He has lived and worked in Paris since 1978.

Initially, his paintings were in an abstract manner very much under the influence of the COBRA (avant-garde movement) movement; he has even been called a Neo-cobra painter. 
His stay in Argentina (1973–1977) saw a radical change in his work. He has since been noted for his liberal and skillful use of vivid and contrasted colours and his enigmatic figures drawn without perspective at various scales and on various planes, sometimes emerging from a layer of paint beneath another one. In his "recouvrements" series, he sometimes even covered older works with thick layers of black paint.

In his recent paintings he has used lighter colours, and the figures are less numerous.

Plessier has also made a series of drawings in homage to Gabriel García Márquez, and a portrait on wood of the author.

Main collective exhibitions

 1969, Centre international d’études pédagogiques, Sèvres
 1978, Dessins et sculptures, Saint Rémi de Chevreuse
 1981, Galerie de l’œil de bœuf, Paris
 1982, Espace Latino-américain, Paris
 1984, 92 du 92, Centre culturel de Boulogne Billancourt
 1985, Salon Mac 2000, Paris

His work has also been shown in Paris at the
Salons de Mai, Jeune peinture in
Montrouge and Figuration critique.

Main personal exhibitions

 1974,1976, Galerie Nice, Buenos Aires
 1978 Galerie du centre, Paris
 1982, Hommage à Gabriel Garcia Marquez, Centre culturel du Mexique, Paris
 1982, Galerie Georges Lavrov, Paris
 1984, La Galerie, Limoges
 1985, A voir et à manger, Les trois limousins, Paris
 1985, Galerie Alberto Elia, Buenos Aires

Bibliography
Macondotierra ou l’anniversaire de la solitude, variations graphiques en forme d’hommage à Gabriel Garcia Marquez, dessins de Claude Plessier, texte d’Alicia Dujovne Ortiz. [Paris], Éditions Polygraphie, « Empreinte » n° 19, 1982, n.p., épuisé.

External links
Claude Plessier's website

1946 births
Living people
Painters from Paris
French contemporary artists
20th-century French painters
20th-century French male artists
French male painters
21st-century French painters